The Peace of Leoben was a general armistice and preliminary peace agreement between the Holy Roman Empire and the First French Republic that ended the War of the First Coalition. It was signed at Eggenwaldsches Gartenhaus, near Leoben, on 18 April 1797 (29 germinal V in the French revolutionary calendar) by General Maximilian von Merveldt and the Marquis of Gallo on behalf of the Emperor Francis II and by General Napoléon Bonaparte on behalf of the French Directory. Ratifications were exchanged in Montebello on 24 May, and the treaty came into effect immediately.

On 30 March, Bonaparte had made his headquarters at Klagenfurt and from there, on 31 March, he sent a letter to the Austrian commander-in-chief, Archduke Charles, requesting an armistice to prevent the further loss of life. Receiving no response, the French advanced as far as Judenburg by the evening of 7 April. That night, Charles proffered a truce for five days, which was accepted. On 13 April, Merveldt went to the French headquarters at Leoben. He requested the armistice be extended so that a preliminary peace could be signed, which was granted, and three proposals were drawn up. The final one was accepted by both sides, and on 18 April at Leoben, the preliminary peace was signed.

The treaty contained nine public articles and eleven secret ones. In the public articles, the Emperor ceded his "Belgian Provinces" (the Austrian Netherlands), and in the secret articles, he ceded his Italian states (Lombardy) in exchange for the Italian mainland possessions of the Republic of Venice, which had not yet been conquered. Except for these personal losses to the ruling Habsburgs, the treaty preserved the integrity of the Holy Roman Empire, unlike in the amplified Treaty of Campo Formio of 17 October 1797.

No final peace between the Holy Roman Empire and France was reached before the outbreak of the War of the Second Coalition in 1799.

Notes

Sources

External links
Text of treaty in original French
 

1797 in the Southern Netherlands
Leoben
Austria–France relations
Leoben
Leoben
Leoben
Leoben
1797 treaties
1797 in Austria
1797 in France
1797 in Italy
1797 in the Habsburg monarchy
1797 in the Holy Roman Empire
France–Holy Roman Empire relations
Fall of the Republic of Venice
Francis II, Holy Roman Emperor
Napoleon